A list of chapters of the college organization Phrateres.

Theta is the only remaining active chapter

References

Lists of organizations
Lists of chapters of United States student societies by society
chapters